Kim Jenner (born 27 February 1998) is an Australian netball player in the Suncorp Super Netball league, playing for the Queensland Firebirds.

Jenner made her debut for the Firebirds in 2017 as a training partner, before being signed by the team permanently ahead of the 2018 season. She won a spot in the starting seven for the first time that season in a match against the Giants, playing goal defence alongside prominent goal keeper Laura Geitz. She established herself as integral player at the Firebirds that season, earning a call up to join the Australian Diamonds as a training partner prior to the September Quad Series and winning a bronze medal with the Australian Fast5 team at the end-of-year World Series event. Jenner was recently selected in the Australian squad for the 2021 Constellation Cup, which was played in New Zealand earlier this year.

Jenner grew up in Townsville and off the court continues to study a Bachelor of Health, Sport & Physical Education degree at The University of Queensland, as well as coaching young netballers.

References

External links
 Queensland Firebirds profile
 Suncorp Super Netball profile
 Netball Draft Central profile

1998 births
Australian netball players
Queensland Firebirds players
Living people
Suncorp Super Netball players
Netball players from Queensland
Queensland state netball league players